The Old Eastern Avenue Bridge (also known erroneously as the King Street Bridge) consists of two bridges spanning the Don River in Toronto, Ontario, Canada. The north bridge or Gas Line Bridge is a concrete arch bridge built for Consumer's Gas Company and is used by Enbridge Gas to carry a major gas main. The southern Howe truss bridge, similar to Queen Street Viaduct and Sir Isaac Brock Bridge, previously carried traffic on Eastern Avenue but is currently unused.

History
The bridge was built in 1933 replacing an older wooden bridge that had been damaged by ice on the Don River in 1900. The original cost was $70,864.07.

The bridge was closed off in 1964 after the construction of the Don Valley Parkway. Eastern's east and west halves crossed the Don River north of the old alignment via a new large bridge with ramps connecting to the Don Valley Parkway, and this viaduct (known as the Eastern Avenue Bypass in some maps) forked out and become the eastern terminus of both Richmond and Adelaide streets. With the Eastern Avenue Bypass just to the north and the elevated Gardiner Expressway just to the south, it was decided that the existing Eastern Avenue bridge was unnecessary at that point on the Don River. The bridge was thus disconnected from the road network, and also fenced in to block pedestrians as the Parkway and the rail lines are both considered hazardous.

The city considered demolishing the unused southern bridge, but found that it would be more expensive than simply maintaining it, and continues to inspect the bridge to this day.

References
"Dead little bridges, like the steel truss-strengthened span on Eastern Avenue, can put an urban explorer in a melancholy mood." John Bentley Mays. The Globe and Mail. Feb 15, 1995. pg. C.3
"Spans recall past Bridges to nowhere rest unnoticed beside Toronto expressway." Donald Grant. The Globe and Mail. Apr 30, 1984. pg. M.3

Bridges in Toronto
Truss bridges in Canada
Bridges completed in 1933